Bert Vlaardingerbroek (born 24 March 1960) is a Dutch former professional darts player who competed in events of the British Darts Organisation (BDO), Professional Darts Corporation (PDC), and World Darts Federation (WDF).

Career

Vlaardingerbroek made four BDO World Darts Championship appearances and lost in the first round each time, losing to Bob Anderson in 1988, Dennis Hickling in 1989, Cliff Lazarenko in 1990 and Martin Phillips in 1992.

He also played in the Winmau World Masters five times, his best performance was a quarter final in 1986, beating Mike Gregory and Lyndon Hextall before losing to Jocky Wilson.

His most successful period in the game came during 1992–93, when he reached the final of the Swiss Open (1992) and twice reached the last four of the Dutch Open (1992–93). He also reached the quarter-finals of the Swiss Open and Belgian Open in 1993. The 1993 Swiss event was the first event to suffer the loss of the 16 "rebel" players who had formed the World Darts Council which led to the split in darts.

The loss of the top players from the BDO/WDF led to opportunities for players to make progress up the world rankings. However, Vlaardingerbroek was not one of those who capitalised and faded from the scene after the 1993 World Masters.

He never featured in the final stages of a major event until reaching the last 32 of the Winmau World Masters in 1999 and then competed in some PDC Pro Tour events in 2003, 2005 & 2006 in his native country, which invites resident country players to compete without having to commit to affiliation of the Professional Dart Players Association.

World Championship results

BDO

1988: 1st Round (lost to Bob Anderson 1–3) (sets)
1989: 1st Round (lost to Dennis Hickling 0–3)
1990: 1st Round (lost to Cliff Lazarenko 2–3)
1992: 1st Round (lost to Martin Phillips 0–3)

Performance timeline

References

External links
Profile and stats on Darts Database

1960 births
Living people
Dutch darts players
Sportspeople from The Hague
British Darts Organisation players
Professional Darts Corporation associate players
Sportspeople from Amsterdam